The 1982 BC Lions finished in fourth place in the West Division with a 9–7 record. Despite the winning record, they still failed to make the playoffs.

Vic Rapp and the coaching staff were fired at the end of the season.

Rookie receiver Merv Fernandez had a great season and was the runner-up in the Schenley Rookie of the Year award voting.

The final game at Empire Stadium was played on November 6th against Montreal.

Willie Fleming was inducted into the Football Hall of Fame.

Offseason

CFL Draft

Preseason

Regular season

Season standings

Season schedule

Awards and records

1982 CFL All-Stars
 DE – Nick Hebeler, CFL All-Star

1982 CFL Western All-Stars
 WR – Mervyn Fernandez, CFL Western All-Star
 DE – Nick Hebeler, CFL Western All-Star
 LB – Glen Jackson, CFL Western All-Star

References

BC Lions seasons
1982 Canadian Football League season by team
1982 in British Columbia